General elections were held in Malaysia on Monday, 29 November 1999. Voting took place in all 193 parliamentary constituencies of Malaysia, each electing one Member of Parliament to the Dewan Rakyat, the dominant house of Parliament. State elections also took place in 394 state constituencies in 11 out of 13 states of Malaysia (except Sabah and Sarawak) on the same day. They were the last elections for Mahathir Mohamad as Prime Minister and Chairman of Barisan Nasional, until 2018. They were also the first elections held in a single day nationwide.

The opposition won a total of 113 state assembly seats, 98 of which went to the PAS, 11 to the DAP and 4 for Keadilan. In the states of  Kelantan and Terengganu, the PAS won by a huge margin–41-2 against Barisan Nasional out of a total of 43 seats and 28-4 out of a total of 32 seats respectively, hence allowing them to form the state governments in these states. In addition, PAS also captured one-third of the state seats in Kedah, with the remaining two-thirds going to Barisan Nasional (UMNO won 16 seats, MCA 2 seats in Kedah).

The election results were seen as a great gain for PAS, who previously had no state seats in Kedah and capturing only one seat in Terengganu in the 1995 General Elections. Observers attributed this to the neglect by the Federal Administration in the states of Terengganu and Kelantan due to administration by different parties.

Results

By state

Johor

Kedah

Kelantan

Kuala Lumpur

Labuan

Malacca

Negeri Sembilan

Pahang

Penang

Perak

Perlis

Sabah

Sarawak

Selangor

Terengganu

See also
1999 Malaysian state elections

References

"Malaysia unlikely to go fundamentalist: Lee Kuan Yew". (Dec. 13, 1999). Agence France Presse.

External links
South Asia Analysis Group synopsis of the 1999 election results.
Trends in Malaysia: Election Assessment (PDF) a 62 pages collection of papers from Institute of Southeast Asian Studies after the 1999 election.

General elections in Malaysia
Malaysia
General